The Anambra State College of Health Technology (ASCOHT), Obosi is a State owned professional and multi disciplinary tertiary training institution located in Obosi town in Idemili North Local Government Area, Anambra State. The college is regulated by the Nigerian board for technical education NBTE, Radiographers Registration Board of Nigeria, Medical laboratory Science Council of Nigeria professional Boards regulating the tertiary institutions in Nigeria from which it has full accreditation under the provost Dr. Mgbakogu Robinson. A.

History 
The Anambra State College of Health Technology, Obosi was established in 1992 following the creation of the present day Anambra state in 1991 under the leadership of Chukwuemeka Ezeife. In 2001, it was formally established by law of the Anambra State House of Assembly ANHA/LAW/2003/2 to train the much needed middle level man power in the health sector for the state, Nigeria primary and secondary health care services.

Courses 
The list of courses offered by the Anambra State College of Health Technology, Obosi include the following:

 Environmental Health Technologists  
 Medical Laboratory Technicians
 Medical Imaging Technologists
 Pharmacy Technicians
 Community Health Extension Workers
 Health Information Management Technicians
 Medical X-ray Technician

Affiliations 
The college is affiliated to Chukwuemeka Odimegwu Ojukwu University Teaching Hospital, Amaku, Awka which offers field training experience to students of the college.

See also 
 College of Health Technology, Ningi

 Lagos State College of Health Technology

 Rivers State College of Health Science and Technology

 Ogun State College of Health Technology

References

External Links 
 

Health sciences schools in Nigeria
Education in Anambra State
Establishments in Nigeria by year
Universities and colleges by date of establishment